Kłosowo may refer to the following places:
Kłosowo, Kartuzy County in Pomeranian Voivodeship (north Poland)
Kłosowo, Malbork County in Pomeranian Voivodeship (north Poland)
Kłosowo, West Pomeranian Voivodeship (north-west Poland)